Disruption, disruptive, or disrupted may refer to:

Business
Creative disruption, disruption concept in a creative context, introduced in 1992 by TBWA's chairman Jean-Marie Dru
Disruptive innovation, Clayton Christensen's theory of industry disruption by new technology or products

Psychology and sociology
Disruptive behavior disorders, a class of mental health disorders
Disruptive physician, a physician whose obnoxious behaviour upsets patients or other staff
Social disruption, a radical alteration, transformation, dysfunction or breakdown of social life

Other uses
Cell disruption is a method or process in cell biology for releasing biological molecules from inside a cell
Disrupted: My Misadventure in the Start Up Bubble, a 2016 book by Daniel Lyons
Disruption (adoption) is also the term for the cancellation of an adoption of a child before it is legally completed
Disruption (of schema), in the field of computer genetic algorithms
Disruption of 1843, the divergence of the Free Church of Scotland from the Church of Scotland
Disruption, a method of disabling an explosive device by using projected water disruptors
The Disruption, a 1996 EP by Cursive

See also 
Disruptor (disambiguation)
Disturbance (disambiguation)